Crystal Lake Hatchery is located in Cassel California, a small town in Northeastern California.

Background 

As time went on, the Crystal Lake Hatchery was moved around and had various names before its current name.  The first site of the hatchery was at Hat Creek, California, which runs off of Lassen Peak and into the Pit River. In 1885, this hatchery was a very small building and had 64 troughs to raise fish in and had the capability of keeping 10 million fish eggs.  In 1888, this site was abandoned due to the decreasing number of salmon runs, and there were not enough salmon around to keep the hatchery open and running.  In 1915, Lassen Peak erupted and made Hat Creek water conditions uninhabitable for salmon with mud, ash, and sediments in the water.  This event was devastating for fish populations.  After that event, a new hatchery along with a fish ladder was built by PG&E along Burney Creek not far from Burney Falls. This new hatchery opened in 1927 and contained dirt ponds as holding areas for fish as well as 100 troughs inside the plant for raising smaller fish.  The year of 1937 there was immense flooding in the area and despite the flooding in the hatchery, it remained in operation until the supply of water was becoming progressively worse, and it eventually closed down. The Burney Creek Hatchery moved to the area of where it is today and became the Crystal Lake Hatchery.  In 1947 is when the hatchery began to be built and the same year it began rearing fish as well with 24 concrete holding pond. Later that year a parasite that killed a bunch of fish Ceratomyxa shasta, was found in Crystal Lake which was their main water source for raising fish in.  They switched their water source to nearby Rock Creek which did not contain the parasite.  In 1976, the hatchery had a re-model and had 7 holding ponds that can raise 1.5 million fish a year. Crystal Lake annually supplies fish to water bodies in Modoc, Lassen, Trinity, Shasta and Siskiyou counties

Fish species 

Crystal Lake Hatchery raises different species of trout that are native and acclimated to Northeastern California.  They breed Eagle Lake Trout, Brown Trout, Rainbow Trout (Pit River Strain), and the Eastern Brook Trout.  

Eagle Lake trout – These are caught in the Pine Creek Fish trap, which feeds into and is located about a mile from Eagle Lake (Lassen County).  These fish are really unique in a way that they are tolerant of alkaline water and they only live in Eagle Lake and Pine Creek. Due to efforts back in the 1950s to preserve them, they can now be found in many bodies of water all over the state of California. 

Brown trout – This species is from Eastern Europe. They can easily take over and decrease native fish, so that is why they are a very common recreational fish for fishermen hobbyists.  If thy are not fished enough, they can eventually outcompete native trout for resources. It can be found just about anywhere in the state. 

Rainbow Trout (Pit River Strain) – Also known for high tolerance for alkalinity and can only be found in Eagle Lake and Pine Creek. 

Eastern brook trout – This species is native to the eastern part of the United States, and were brought into California on a train.   Eastern Brook Trout are sensitive to changes in the water such as pollution and acidity, and are commonly found in water in higher elevations.

Catching and spawning process

The process first begins at the Pine Creek Fish Trap. Workers from the hatchery collect fish to be spawned, then sort through them to select the best suited fish to be bred. They then gently squeeze out fish eggs and sperm into a pan to get fertilized. The fertilized eggs are incubated in tubes under special conditions until they can be moved to inside holding tanks. Then when they are large enough they are put outside in large concrete holding tanks with netting the surrounds the whole outside area to prevent birds of prey from eating the growing fish.

References

Fish hatcheries in the United States